Marquess Gong of Han (died 363 BC), ancestral name Jì (姬), clan name Hán (韩), personal name Ruòshān (若山), was the ruler of the State of Han between 374 BC and until his death in 363 BC. He was the son of Marquess Ai of Han.

After Marquess Ai of Han was killed, the nobles supported Ruoshan, the son of Ai, to be the next ruler of Han. After Ai died due to illness in 363 BC, the succession then passed to Marquess Xi, son of Ai.

References

360s BC deaths
Zhou dynasty nobility
Monarchs of Han (state)
Year of birth unknown